Sidney King (1885–1972) was an English cricketer.  King's batting style is unknown.  He was born at Rushden, Northamptonshire.

King made his first-class debut for Northamptonshire against Gloucestershire in the 1907 County Championship.  He made three further first-class appearances, the last of which came against Hampshire in the 1908 County Championship.  In his four first-class matches, he scored 47 runs at an average of 9.40, with a high score of 23.

He died at the town of his birth sometime in 1977.

References

External links
Sidney King at ESPNcricinfo
Sidney King at CricketArchive

1885 births
1972 deaths
People from Rushden
English cricketers
Northamptonshire cricketers